Victor Habert-Dassault (born 12 July 1992) is a French politician of The Republican Group who currently serves as a member of the 15th legislature of the French Fifth Republic, representing Oise's 1st constituency.

Early life 
Habert-Dassault was born on 12 July 1992 in Paris. He is the nephew of Olivier Dassault, the grandson of Serge Dassault and the great-grandson of Marcel Dassault, founder of the Dassault Group.

He studied at the London School of Economics and worked as a lawyer.

Career 
On 6 June 2021, in the second round of a by-election in the first constituency of Oise, he won 80.4% of the votes cast against the candidate of the National Rally. He succeeds his uncle Olivier Dassault, who died in March of the same year.

References 

Deputies of the 15th National Assembly of the French Fifth Republic
1992 births
Living people
The Republicans (France) politicians
Alumni of the London School of Economics
Politicians from Paris
Lawyers from Paris
Deputies of the 16th National Assembly of the French Fifth Republic